Matúš Katunský (born 20 March 2001) is a Slovak professional footballer who plays as a defender for Fortuna Liga club Sereď, on loan from FC Košice.

Club career

ŠKF Sereď
Katunský made his Fortuna Liga debut for Sereď during an away fixture against Žilina on 25 July 2021. He completed the entirety of the 0–3 defeat.

References

External links
 ŠKF Sereď official club profile 
 
 Futbalnet profile 
 

2001 births
Living people
Sportspeople from Košice
Slovak footballers
Slovakia youth international footballers
Association football defenders
FC Košice (2018) players
FK Slavoj Trebišov players
ŠKF Sereď players
2. Liga (Slovakia) players
Slovak Super Liga players